On Little Known Frequencies is the fourth and final studio album by the post-rock band From Monument to Masses. Released on March 10, 2009, this album is the first album of new music released by From Monument to Masses since 2003, making it the band's fourth release on Dim Mak Records. As with other albums released by the group, sung lyrics do not play a part in the album, with numerous television, radio and film sound clips played within tracks.

Track listing
 "Checksum" - 6:26
 "(Millions Of) Individual Factories" - 5:43
 "Beyond God & Elvis" - 4:45
Contains quotations from the film Fast Food Nation
 "A Sixth Trumpet" - 5:36
 "An Ounce Of Prevention" - 9:20
Contains quotation from Mario Savio on the operation of the machine
 "The First Five" - 3:02
 "Let Them Know It's Christmastime" - 8:52
 "Hammer & Nails" - 8:12

Personnel

According to the album liner notes, the contributors were as follows:

Francis Choung - Group Member
Matthew Solberg - Group Member
Sergio Robledo-Maderazo - Group Member, Design, Photography, Illustrations, Vocal Engineer, Photo Manipulation
Matt Bayles - Production, Engineering, Mixing
Ed Brooks - Mastering
Princess Bustos - Vocals
Joshua F. Castro - Vocals
Carla Bayani Cienfuegos - Liner Notes
Laura Dean - Assistant
DJ Patrick - Turntables
Drew Fischer - String Engineer
Keith Freund - Editing
Robin Landy - Guitar
Ceceilia Madariaga - Cello
Elizabeth Montgomery - Viola
Liezel Rivera - Vocals
Ota Yoshiharu - Photography
Theo Zimmerman - Cello

References

External links
 Official website
 MySpace page
 Dim Mak Records
 RCRD LBL page
 FMTM on YouTube

2009 albums
Dim Mak Records albums